Ontario Local Schools is a public school district  serving students in the city of Ontario, most of Springfield Township, and southern parts of Sandusky Township in Richland County, Ohio (U.S.).

Schools

Elementary schools

 Stingel Elementary School (K–5)

Middle schools
Ontario Middle School (6–8)

High schools
 Ontario High School (9–12)

Former schools
 Bedford School – (now the Ontario Free United Methodist Church is located at the old Bedford School site)
 Springfield Township School – built in 1928–1929, was the Ontario Junior High School before it closed for good. On April 24, 2003, the old school was listed on the National Register of Historic Places. In 2007, the old school was demolished to make way for the new Park Meadows Senior Apartments.

References

External links
 

Education in Richland County, Ohio
School districts in Ohio